Andreea Mitu and İpek Soylu were the defending champions, but chose not to compete together. Mitu played alongside Mariana Duque Mariño, but lost in the quarterfinals to Tímea Babos and Çağla Büyükakçay. Soylu teamed up with Hsieh Su-wei, but lost in the first round to Dalila Jakupović and Nadiia Kichenok.

Jakupović and Kichenok went on to win the title, defeating Nicole Melichar and Elise Mertens in the final,  7–6(8–6), 6–2.

Seeds

Draw

Draw

References
 Main Draw

Istanbul Cup - Doubles
2017 Doubles
2017 in Istanbul
2017 in Turkish tennis
Istan